Afanasyevsky (masculine), Afanasyevskaya (feminine), or Afanasyevskoye (neuter) may refer to:
Afanasyevsky District, a district of Kirov Oblast, Russia
Afanasyevsky (rural locality) (Afanasyevskaya, Afanasyevskoye), name of several rural localities in Russia